The Roman Catholic Diocese of Mbulu is a diocese located in the city of Mbulu in the Ecclesiastical province of Arusha in Tanzania. The seat of the Bishop is the Cathedral Church of the Virgin Mary.

History
 April 14, 1943: Established as Apostolic Prefecture of Mbulu from the Apostolic Prefecture of Dodoma and the Apostolic Vicariate of Kilima-Njaro
 January 10, 1952: Promoted as Apostolic Vicariate of Mbulu
 March 25, 1953: Promoted as Diocese of Mbulu

Leadership
 Prefect Apostolic of Mbulu (Roman rite) 
 Fr. Patrick Winters, S.A.C. (1944.01.28 – 1952.01.10 see below)
 Vicar Apostolic of Mbulu (Roman rite) 
 Patrick Winters, S.A.C. (see above 1952.01.10 – 1953.03.25 see below)
 Bishops of Mbulu (Roman rite)
 Patrick Winters, S.A.C. (see above 1953.03.25 – 1971.07.03)
 Nicodemus Atle Basili Hhando (1971.07.03 – 1997.03.07)
 Juda Thadaeus Ruwa’ichi, O.F.M. Cap. (1999.02.09 – 2005.01.15), appointed Bishop of Dodoma
 Beatus Kinyaiya, O.F.M. Cap. (2006.04.22 - 2014.06.11), appointed Archbishop of Dodoma
 Antony Gaspar Lagwen (since 2018.05.22)

See also
Roman Catholicism in Tanzania

References

Sources
 GCatholic.org
 Catholic Hierarchy

Mbulu
Christian organizations established in 1943
Roman Catholic dioceses and prelatures established in the 20th century
Mbulu, Roman Catholic Diocese of